William Henry Moore (December 12, 1901 – May 24, 1972) was a backup catcher in Major League Baseball who played in parts of the  and  seasons for the Boston Red Sox. Listed at 5 11", 170 lb., Moore batted left-handed and threw right-handed. He was born in Kansas City, Missouri.

In a 20-game career, Moore was a .207 hitter (18-for-87) with nine runs, two doubles, and four RBI without home runs.

Moore died at the age of 70 in his hometown of Kansas City, Missouri.

See also
1926 Boston Red Sox season
1927 Boston Red Sox season

External links
Baseball Reference – major league statistics
Baseball Reference – minor league statistics
Retrosheet

Major League Baseball catchers
Boston Red Sox players
Independence Producers players
Little Rock Travelers players
Mobile Bears players
Mobile Marines players
Knoxville Smokies players
Nashville Vols players
Portland Eskimos players
Topeka Senators players
Baseball players from Kansas City, Missouri
1901 births
1972 deaths